Quixeramobim (formally Santo Antônio do Boqueirão de Quixeramobim; formerly Nova Vila do Campo Maior) is a municipality in central State of Ceará, northeastern Brazil. It has a population of about 81,778 (2020 est). The local biome is caatinga hiperxerófila.

Climate
Semi-arid tropical warm with rainfall concentrated from February to April. The average temperature is 26–28 °C and the average annual rainfall is 499 mm.

The Paus Brancos district of the municipality was designated a priority area for conservation and sustainable use when the Caatinga Ecological Corridor was created in 2006.

History
It was founded in the 17th century on lands adjacent to Rio Ibu (Quixeramobim) and became a municipality in 1755.

Economy
The primary economic occupations are farming and ranching.

Famous residents
Antônio Conselheiro (1830–1879), religious leader

References

Quixeramobim

Municipalities in Ceará